Takamatsu may refer to:

People 
Prince Takamatsu,  third son of Emperor Taishō
Takamatsu (surname)

Places 
Takamatsu, Kagawa, a city in Japan
Takamatsu Station (disambiguation), several different train stations in Japan
Takamatsu Domain, a Japanese domain during the Edo period 
Takamatsu Castle (disambiguation), several different
Takamatsu Airport